Francesco Imparato (1570) was an Italian painter of the Renaissance period, active mainly in his city of birth, Naples.

Father of Girolamo Imparato. He trained under Giovanni Filippo Criscuolo, where he became a close friend and fellow-pupil of Fabrizio Santafede. He became a follower of Andrea Sabbatini (di Salerno).

References

16th-century Neapolitan people
16th-century Italian painters
Italian male painters
Painters from Naples
Italian Mannerist painters
Year of birth uncertain
1570 deaths